John R. Dryden (21 August 1908 – 1975) was an English professional association footballer who played as a winger for a number of Football League clubs in the 1930s before his career was interrupted by the Second World War.

References

Footballers from Northumberland
English footballers
Association football midfielders
Newcastle United F.C. players
Exeter City F.C. players
Sheffield United F.C. players
Bristol City F.C. players
Burnley F.C. players
English Football League players
1908 births
1975 deaths